Peter Simako Otlaadisang Mmusi (born 16 May 1929, died October 1994) was the Vice-President of Botswana from 3 January 1983 until 1992. He also served as the Minister of Finance from 1980 to 1989, and as the Minister of Local Government and Lands. He was born in Mmankgodi in the Kweneng District.

He resigned following a Presidential Commission which identified him as taking part in illegal land dealings outside Gaborone.

References

Vice-presidents of Botswana
Finance ministers of Botswana
1929 births
1994 deaths
Botswana Democratic Party politicians